Ong Beng Teong  (Chinese: 王明忠; born 29 May 1962) is a former badminton player from Malaysia.

Career
Ong won the gold medal at the 1982 Commonwealth Games in the men's doubles together with Razif Sidek. In the 1988 Thomas Cup he represented Malaysia and reached with the team the final of the cup. In the final he played the men's doubles with Cheah Soon Kit and lost with him to the Chinese pair Chen Kang and Chen Hongyong 12-15 and 12–15.

Personal life
Ong is the head coach and founder of Pro Badminton Academy, a badminton training academy running in both Kuala Lumpur and Melbourne, Australia. His two children, Nicholas and Andrew currently live in Melbourne.

Achievements

Southeast Asian Games 
Men's singles

Men's doubles

Commonwealth Games 
Men's doubles

IBF World Grand Prix 
The World Badminton Grand Prix sanctioned by International Badminton Federation (IBF) from 1983 to 2006.

Men's doubles

Honours
  :
  Herald of the Order of Loyalty to the Royal Family of Malaysia (B.S.D) (1988)

References

External links
Pro Badminton Academy official website
The Star Article
The Star Article 
The Star Article 

1962 births
Sportspeople from Kuala Lumpur
Living people
Australian sportspeople of Chinese descent
Malaysian sportspeople of Chinese descent
Malaysian emigrants to Australia
Malaysian male badminton players
Australian male badminton players
Commonwealth Games gold medallists for Malaysia
Badminton players at the 1982 Commonwealth Games
Commonwealth Games medallists in badminton
Badminton coaches
Southeast Asian Games medalists in badminton
Southeast Asian Games silver medalists for Malaysia
Southeast Asian Games bronze medalists for Malaysia
Competitors at the 1985 Southeast Asian Games
Medallists at the 1982 Commonwealth Games